The 1971 Ohio State Buckeyes football team represented the Ohio State University in the 1971 Big Ten Conference football season. The Buckeyes compiled a 6–4 record.

The Buckeyes entered the season knowing it could not go to a bowl game, due to the Big Ten's "no repeat" rule, prohibiting conference schools from appearing in the Rose Bowl in consecutive seasons, plus the rule banning schools from playing in any bowl other than the Rose Bowl. The no-repeat rule was rescinded December 9 and went into effect for 1972; the prohibition on playing in bowls other than the Rose was not repealed until 1975.

This was the first season Ohio Stadium had artificial turf. The playing surface was scheduled to be installed in time for the 1970 season, but had been delayed. The AstroTurf field remained in place through the 1989 season.

Schedule

Personnel

Game summaries

Iowa

    
    
    
    
    
    
    
    
    
    
    

Don Lamka, who spent the last two seasons as a reserve defensive back, made his debut at quarterback with 211 total yards and four touchdowns.

Colorado

California

Illinois

Indiana

Wisconsin

Minnesota

Michigan State

Northwestern

Michigan

1972 NFL draftees

References

Ohio State
Ohio State Buckeyes football seasons
Ohio State Buckeyes football